There are over 20,000 Grade II* listed buildings in England.  This page is a list of the 71 of these buildings in the county of Rutland.

Rutland

|}

See also
 Grade I listed buildings in Rutland

Notes

References 
English Heritage Images of England

External links

 
Rutland
Lists of listed buildings in Rutland